MV Islamabad is the largest general cargo and container ship built in Pakistan at the Karachi Shipyard & Engineering Works (KSEW). Built in 1982, the ship is in service with Pakistan National Shipping Corporation.

References

 Pakistan Economist.com article on Pakistani shipping and MV Islamabad.
 Pakistan National Shipping Corporation webpage for MV Islamabad

Container ships
1982 ships